Birger Wernerfelt (born 1951) is a Danish economist and management theorist, and JC Penney Professor of Management at the MIT Sloan School of Management. He is best known for “A Resource-based View of the Firm” (1984), which is one of the most cited papers in the social sciences.

Biography 
Born in Denmark, Wernerfelt obtained his BA in Philosophy from the University of Copenhagen, where he also obtained his MA in Economics in 1974. He then moved to Harvard University, where he obtained his DBA in Managerial Economics in 1977. In 2012 he obtained an honorary doctoral degree by the Copenhagen Business School.

Wernerfelt started his academic career at the University of Copenhagen. In the early 1980s he was faculty member of the Graduate School of Business Administration at the University of Michigan. In 1986 he was appointed Associate Professor of Policy and Environment at the Kellogg School of Management at Northwestern University. In 1989 he moved to the MIT Sloan School of Management, where he is appointed JC Penney Professor of Management.

He is married to Harvard Professor Cynthia Montgomery.

Work 
Wernerfelt has done foundational and often iconoclastic work in economics, management strategy, and marketing. He is best known for “A Resource-based View of the Firm” (1984), which is one of the most cited papers in the social sciences. Based on the premise that firms are heterogeneous, the article characterizes sustainable differences (resources), suggests that optimal competitive strategies are based on leveraging excess capacity of these resources, and describes how current resources can be used to develop new ones.

In the last several years, Wernerfelt has been working on an economic theory of the firm. A fairly comprehensive statement of the theory can be found in “The Comparative Advantages of Firms, Markets, and Contracts: A Unified Theory” (2015).

The paper portrays the most efficient labor market mechanism as a function of the advantages of specialization, workers’ costs of switching between entrepreneurs, and the frequency with which entrepreneurs’ needs change. Under the assumptions of the model, there exist three regions in which firms, markets, and sequences of bilateral contracts are weakly more efficient than all other mechanisms in a big class. Echoing the management literature, the firm grows as long as it can use specialized employees to perform the new tasks. The scope of the firm is determined by the point at which this no longer is possible.

As part of this stream, Wernerfelt has written several papers on the nature and incidence of bargaining costs. In other works, he has developed implications of the theory to show that the employer should own most of the productive assets, that incentives are weaker inside firms, and that more information is communicated within than between firms.

In the book, “Adaptation, Specialization, and the Theory of the Firm: Foundations of the Resource-Based View” (2016), Wernerfelt starts with his economic theory of the firm and derives the Resource-Based View, thus showing that the two perspectives are consistent.

Selected publications 
Articles, a selection:
 Wernerfelt, Birger. "A resource‐based view of the firm." Strategic Management Journal 5.2 (1984): 171-180.
 Wernerfelt, Birger. "The Comparative Advantages of Firms, Markets, and Contracts: A Unified Theory." Economica 82.236 (2015): 350-67.
 Wernerfelt, Birger. "General Equilibrium with Real Time Search in Labor and Product Markets." Journal of Political Economy 96.3 (1988): 821-31.
 Simester, Duncan I., and Birger Wernerfelt. "Determinants of Asset Ownership: A Study of the Carpentry Trade." Review of Economics and Statistics 87.1 (2005): 50-58.
 Wernerfelt, Birger. "A Rational Reconstruction of the Compromise Effect: Using Market Data to Infer Utilities." Journal of Consumer Research 21.4 (1995): 627-33.
 Wernerfelt, Birger, and Cynthia A. Montgomery. "Tobin's q and the Importance of Focus in Firm Performance." American Economic Review 78.1 (1988): 246-50.
 Fornell, Claes, and Birger Wernerfelt. "Defensive marketing strategy by customer complaint management: a theoretical analysis." Journal of Marketing research 24.4 (1987): 337-346.
 Hansen, Gary S., and Birger Wernerfelt. "Determinants of firm performance: The relative importance of economic and organizational factors." Strategic Management Journal 10.5 (1989): 399-411.
 Chatterjee, Sayan, and Birger Wernerfelt. "The link between resources and type of diversification: Theory and evidence." Strategic management journal 12.1 (1991): 33-48.
 Wernerfelt, Birger. "The resource‐based view of the firm: Ten years after." Strategic Management Journal 16.3 (1995): 171-174.

References

External links 
 homepage at MIT Sloan

1951 births
Living people
Danish business theorists
University of Copenhagen alumni
Harvard Business School alumni
Academic staff of the University of Copenhagen
University of Michigan faculty
Northwestern University faculty
Harvard University faculty
MIT Sloan School of Management faculty